Fred Whitelaw may refer to:
Fred Whitelaw (footballer) (1878–1959), Australian rules footballer who played with St Kilda 
Fred Whitelaw (brigadier), Australian brigadier